Arijana Boras (born 15 December 1976) is a Bosnian alpine skier. She competed at the 1992 Winter Olympics, representing Yugoslavia, and the 1994 Winter Olympics and the 1998 Winter Olympics, representing Bosnia and Herzegovina.

References

1976 births
Living people
Bosnia and Herzegovina female alpine skiers
Olympic alpine skiers of Yugoslavia
Olympic alpine skiers of Bosnia and Herzegovina
Alpine skiers at the 1992 Winter Olympics
Alpine skiers at the 1994 Winter Olympics
Alpine skiers at the 1998 Winter Olympics
People from Konjic